The Men's 50 metre butterfly competition of the 2018 African Swimming Championships was held on 15 September 2018.

Records
Prior to the competition, the existing world and championship records were as follows.

Results

Heats
The heats were started on 12 September at 10:25.

Final
The final was started on 12 September.

References

Men's 50 metre butterfly